is a Japanese anime television series that adapted several Agatha Christie stories about Hercule Poirot and Miss Marple. A new character named Maybelle West, Miss Marple's great-niece, who becomes Poirot's junior assistant, is used to connect the two detectives.

The series was broadcast from 4 July 2004 to 15 May 2005 on NHK, and continues to be shown in re-runs on NHK and other networks in Japan. The series was adapted as manga under the same title, which was released in 2004 and 2005.

Adaptation 

The TV series is a generally faithful adaptation of the original stories given the time constraints (typically one 25-minute episode for a short story, four episodes for a novel). Despite being a modern Japanese adaptation, the original (mainly English) locations and time period are retained. The most obvious story change is the addition of Mabel West and her pet duck, Oliver. However, apart from her soliloquies, most of her lines are taken from the incidental dialogue of other characters in the original stories, so her presence does not materially alter the plot development. 

Other changes include Inspector Japp becoming "Inspector Sharpe", possibly due to the derogatory implications attached to the word "jap". The significance of some details which rely on English idioms is changed, for example when a dying uncle taps his eye in Strange Jest, this was originally a reference to the saying All my eye and Betty Martin, but in the anime it becomes a reference to a stamp in which an angel appears to be winking (however the clue still achieves the same end).

Characters 

Hercule Poirot: 
Jane Marple: 
Mabel West: 
Oliver West: 
Miss Lemon: 
Hastings: 
Inspector Sharpe:

Media

Anime 

The anime was produced by Oriental Light and Magic for NHK. The series was directed by Naohito Takahashi with music by Toshiyuki Watanabe and character designs by Sayuri Ichiishi. The opening theme is "Lucky Girl ni Hanataba wo" and the ending theme is "Wasurenaide," both performed by Tatsuro Yamashita. The 39 episodes were initially broadcast in Japan on NHK stations from 4 July 2004 to 15 May 2005. The series was released on seven DVDs.

DVD 
Region 2, NTSC,
Language: Japanese,
subtitle: No

Manga 
Three volumes of the manga adaptation of the television series were released in 2004 and 2005 by NHK Publishing, the publishing division of NHK.

References

External links 
 Official site at NHK 
 
 Series listing at Aga Search 

2004 anime television series debuts
2004 manga
Detective anime and manga
Detective television series
Films based on works by Agatha Christie
NHK original programming
Odex
OLM, Inc.